Flag Officer, Carriers and Amphibious Ships (FOCAS)  was a senior Royal Navy post that existed from 1970 to 1979. However, its antecedents date to 1931.

A Flag Officer with specific responsibilities for command of aircraft carriers within the Royal Navy was first established in September 1931 with the appointment of Rear-Admiral Reginald Henderson as Rear-Admiral, Aircraft Carriers. He was succeeded by Rear-Admiral the Hon. Sir Alexander R. M. Ramsay later Vice-Admiral, Aircraft Carriers. The post was held by successive flag officers under the titles listed below. In June 1968 the post Rear-Admiral, Carriers was renamed to Flag Officer, Carriers and Amphibious Ships (FOCAS). The post was renamed Flag Officer, Third Flotilla in December 1979. The admiral commanding's remit was broadened to include units other than aircraft carriers and amphibious ships.

The office holder reported to different senior flag officers during its existence including the Commander-in-Chief, Home Fleet, the Commander-in-Chief, Western Fleet and finally the Commander-in-Chief Fleet.

Rear-Admirals/Vice-Admirals Aircraft Carriers
Post holders included:

Flag Officer, Mediterranean Aircraft Carriers

Admirals Commanding, Home Fleet Aircraft Carriers

On hauling down his flag as Vice-Admiral, Home Fleet Aircraft Carriers, about 27 April 1943, Admiral Lyster was appointed Flag Officer Carrier Training and Administration at HMS Monck (HQ Combined Training, Largs), which was transferred from 1 June 1944 to HMS Faraway, a training establishment & HQ of Flag Officer Carrier Training, at Greenock. He served in that post until 17.03.1945.

Rear-Admiral Charles Woodhouse was listed as Rear-Admiral Aircraft Carriers, aboard , March–April 1946.

Flag Officer, Aircraft Carriers
Duties may have included (a) being responsible for the Fleet Air Arm afloat (b) ensuring the operational effectiveness of Carrier Task Groups. Probably referring to pre-1967 when Home Fleet still existed.

Admirals flying this flag included:

In July 1970 the post was renamed Flag Officer, Carriers and Amphibious Ships.

Flag Officer, Carriers and Amphibious Ships
Included:

Notes

References 
 
 Brown, David K. (2006). Nelson to Vanguard : warship development, 1923-1945 (Paperback ed. ed.). London: Chatham. .
 Drucker, G. (2005). "Fleet Air Arm Service Records: Flag Officer Index". Fleet Air Arm Archive.
 Mackie, Colin. (2018) "Royal Navy Senior Appointments from 1865" (PDF). gulabin.com. Colin Mackie. Scotland, UK.
 Tailyour, Ewen Southby (1990). Reasons in Writing: A Commando's View of the Falklands War. Barnsley, England: Pen and Sword. .
 The Fighting Services". (1960). Aeroplane and Commercial Aviation News. Volume 99.

C
1970 establishments in the United Kingdom
1979 disestablishments in the United Kingdom